Robert Parys (died 1408), of Hildersham, Cambridgeshire, was an English politician.

He was a Member (MP) of the Parliament of England for Cambridgeshire in September 1388 and was picked High Sheriff of Cambridgeshire and Huntingdonshire for 1386–87 and 1390–91.

References

14th-century births
1408 deaths
English MPs September 1388
People from South Cambridgeshire District
High Sheriffs of Cambridgeshire and Huntingdonshire